Ramal do Louriçal is a Portuguese railway line managed by Infraestruturas de Portugal which connects Louriçal railway station, on the Linha do Oeste, to two paper factories: Celbi and The Navigator Company. The electrified freight line was opened in 1993.

See also
List of railway lines in Portugal
List of Portuguese locomotives and railcars
History of rail transport in Portugal

References

Sources

Lourical
Iberian gauge railways
Railway lines opened in 1993